Juan Cabano (8 July 1896 – 15 September 1949) was an Argentine footballer. He played in two matches for the Argentina national football team from 1914 to 1916. He was also part of Argentina's squad for the 1916 South American Championship.

References

External links
 
 

1896 births
1949 deaths
Argentine footballers
Argentina international footballers
Place of birth missing
Association football forwards
Argentino de Quilmes players